was a town located in Hoi District, Aichi Prefecture, Japan.

As of November 1, 2007, (the last census information available) the town had an estimated population of 22,708 and a population density of 2,188.31 persons per km². The total area was 9.92 km².

On February 1, 2010, Kozakai was merged into the expanded city of Toyokawa. Therefore, Hoi District was dissolved as a result of this merger.

History
October 1, 1889 – Toyoaki Village (豊秋村) was founded.
September 12, 1906 – Kozakai Village was founded by the unification of Toyoaki Village and Ina Village (伊奈村).
September 12, 1926 – Kozakai Town was founded.
1973 – Toyokawa Shinkin Bank Incident (豊川信用金庫事件 Toyokawa Shin'yō Kinko Jiken) occurred.
1993 – Kozakai Town Cultural Hall (小坂井町文化会館) was completed.
February 1, 2010 – Kozakai merged with the city of Toyokawa.

Education

Primary schools
Kozakai Nishi Primary School
Kozakai Higashi Primary School

Junior High school
Kozakai Junior High School

High school
Kozakai High School

Social education

Ceremony Hall
Kozakai Town Cultural Hall (小坂井町文化会館 Kozakai-chō Bunka Kaikan ; commonly called "Freuden Hall")

Transportation

Railway
Central Japan Railway Company
Iida Line – Kozakai Station
Tōkaidō Main Line – Nishi-Kozakai Station
Meitetsu Nagoya Main Line – Ina Station

Road

National highway
National highway – Route 1, Route 151, Route 247

Local attractions

Utari Jinja (菟足神社)
Gosha Inari (五社稲荷)
Ruins of Ina Castle (伊奈城趾)

Noted persons from Kozakai
Yasuhiko Okada (岡田 康彦 Okada Yasuhiko) – Former Administrative Vice-Minister of the Environment of Japan

External links

 Toyokawa Official website 

Dissolved municipalities of Aichi Prefecture
Toyokawa, Aichi